Statistics of Czechoslovak First League in the 1978–79 season.

Overview
It was contested by 16 teams, and Dukla Prague won the championship. Karel Kroupa and Zdeněk Nehoda were the league's top scorers with 17 goals each.

Stadia and locations

League standings

Results

Top goalscorers

References

Czechoslovakia - List of final tables (RSSSF)

Czechoslovak First League seasons
Czech
1978–79 in Czechoslovak football